Kenwood Marshall Dennard (born March 1, 1956, New York City) is an American jazz drummer.

Dennard learned piano as a child and took up drumming at nine years of age. He attended the Manhattan School of Music from 1972 to 1973 and Berklee College of Music from 1973 to 1976. Later in the decade he worked with Dizzy Gillespie, Pat Martino, High Life and Brand X. He played with Martino again in the late 1980s and with The Manhattan Transfer, Dianne Reeves, Jaco Pastorius, Lew Soloff, Bob Moses, and Stanley Jordan during that decade.

In the 1990s he worked with Miles Davis, Maceo Parker, Quincy Jones, and Howard Johnson. He also led his own ensembles, including Just Advance, the Meta-Funk All Stars, and Quintessence; his sidemen have included Victor Bailey, Dave Bargeron, Hiram Bullock, Stanton Davis, Marcus Miller, and Herman Wright Jr. In 1999 he began teaching at Berklee.

Discography

As leader
 Just Advance (Big World Music, 1992)
 Show No Fear (Groove Economy Records, 2018)

As sideman
With Dave Bargeron
 1995 Barge Burns...Slide Flies 
 2002 Tuba Tuba

With Brand X
 1977 Livestock
 1977 Live from San Francisco
 1987 X-Trax
 2000 Timeline
 2003 Macrocosm: Introducing...Brand X
 2016 Rochester 1977

With Stanley Jordan
 1990 Cornucopia 
 1991 Stolen Moments
 2008 State of Nature
 2011 Friends

With Pat Martino
 1976 Joyous Lake
 1998 Stone Blue
 1999 First Light

With Maceo Parker :Parker

 1992 Life on Planet Groove

With Jaco Pastorius
 1989 PDB 
 1990 Live in New York City Vol. 1: Punk Jazz
 1991 Live in New York City Vol. 2: Trio
 1991 Live in New York City Vol. 3: Promise Land
 1992 Live in New York City Vol. 4: Trio 2
 1998 Holiday for Pans
 1999 Live in New York City Vol. 6: Punk Jazz 2
 2001 Live in New York City
 2002 Modern Electric Bass: Revised Edition

With Dianne Reeves
 1977 For Every Heart 
 1996 The Grand Encounter
 1996 The Palo Alto Sessions

With others
 1987 Nothing Like the Sun, Sting
 1987 The Story of Moses, Bob Moses
 1988 Diamond Land, Toninho Horta
 1992 Il Suono, John Clark
 1993 Miles & Quincy Live at Montreux, Miles Davis/Quincy Jones
 1995 Gravity!!!, Howard Johnson
 1995 Sweetest Days, Vanessa Williams
 1996 Sketches of Coryell, Larry Coryell
 2003 Soul Manifesto Live, Rodney Jones
 2007 Live Vol. 1, Robin Eubanks
 2012 David Fiuczynksi's Planet Microjam, David Fiuczynski

References

Mark Gilbert, "Kenwood Dennard". The New Grove Dictionary of Jazz. 2nd edition, ed. Barry Kernfeld.

American jazz drummers
Musicians from New York City
1956 births
Living people
Manhattan School of Music alumni
Berklee College of Music alumni
20th-century American drummers
American male drummers
Jazz musicians from New York (state)
20th-century American male musicians
American male jazz musicians
Brand X members